Aberdeen Donside (Gaelic: Obar Dheathain Oir Dheathain) is a constituency of the Scottish Parliament (Holyrood) covering part of the council area of Aberdeen City. It elects one Member of the Scottish Parliament (MSP) by the first past the post method of election. It is one of ten constituencies in the North East Scotland electoral region, which elects seven additional members, in addition to the ten constituency MSPs, to produce a form of proportional representation for the region as a whole.

The seat has been held by Jackie Dunbar of the Scottish National Party since the 2021 Scottish Parliament election.

Electoral region

The other nine constituencies of the North East Scotland region are: Aberdeen Central, Aberdeen South and North Kincardine, Aberdeenshire East, Aberdeenshire West, Angus North and Mearns, Angus South, Banffshire and Buchan Coast, Dundee City East and Dundee City West.

The region covers all of the Aberdeen City council area, the Aberdeenshire council area, the Angus council area, the Dundee City council area and part of the Moray council area.

Constituency boundaries and council area 

Following their First Periodic review of parliamentary constituencies to the Scottish Parliament, the Boundary Commission for Scotland created three newly shaped seats for the Aberdeen City council area. The Aberdeen City council area is now divided between three constituencies: Aberdeen Central, Aberdeen Donside and Aberdeen South and North Kincardine. Central and Donside are entirely within the city area, while South and North Kincardine also takes in North Kincardine in the Aberdeenshire council area.

Aberdeen Donside covers the northern area of the city, and comprises the following electoral wards:

In full: 
Dyce/Bucksburn/Danestone
Bridge of Don
Kingswells/Sheddocksley/Summerhill
Northfield/Mastrick North
In part:
Hilton/Woodside/Stockethill (shared with Aberdeen Central)

Member of the Scottish Parliament

Election results

2020s

2010s

2000s
The following is the notional result for the 2007 Scottish Parliament election, as calculated by the BBC.

Politics and history of the constituency
The area contains Aberdeen Airport (run by BAA),

Prior to the 2011 election, the Liberal Democrat candidate (Cllr Gordon Leslie), stood down amid allegations related to prostitution.

See also
2013 Aberdeen Donside by-election
Aberdeen City Youth Council

References

External links

Politics of Aberdeen
Scottish Parliament constituencies and regions from 2011
Constituencies of the Scottish Parliament
Constituencies established in 2011
2011 establishments in Scotland